The 1972 Princeton Tigers football team was an American football team that represented Princeton University during the 1972 NCAA University Division football season. Princeton finished sixth in the Ivy League.

In their fourth and final year under head coach Jake McCandless, the Tigers compiled a 3–5–1 record and were outscored 161 to 118. Michael L. Kincaid was the team captain.

Princeton's 2–4–1 conference record tied for sixth in the Ivy League standings. The Tigers were outscored 120 to 87 by Ivy opponents.

Princeton played its home games at Palmer Stadium on the university campus in Princeton, New Jersey.

Schedule

References

Princeton
Princeton Tigers football seasons
Princeton Tigers football